The 1945–46 season was Birmingham City Football Club's first season played under that name in nationally-organised football. The club had been called Birmingham F.C. since 1905, and the City suffix was added in 1943. Although the Football League did not resume until the 1946–47 season, the FA Cup restarted in 1945. Birmingham reached the semi-final, in which they lost to Derby County after extra time in a replay, played at Maine Road, Manchester, in front of 80,407 spectators. In league competition, Birmingham were champions of the first and only edition of the Football League South, taking the title on goal average from local rivals Aston Villa.

Twenty-four players made at least one Football League South appearance, though only twelve appeared regularly, the remaining twelve making just 36 appearances between them. Full-back Dennis Jennings missed only one of the 42 matches over the season. Charlie Wilson Jones was leading scorer with 20 goals in league competition. In the FA Cup, the same eleven players were selected for all the ties, apart from Sid King replacing Gil Merrick in goal for two of the ten matches.

Football League South

The Football League North and South were set up as a precursor to the resumption of the Football League proper the following season. They included those teams playing in the First and Second Divisions in the 1939–40 Football League season abandoned when war broke out, divided on a regional basis. Because registration rules had not been strictly observed during the war, and with many players still away on military service, teams were permitted to field guest players.

On the last day of the season, Aston Villa had already completed their fixtures. Both Birmingham and Charlton Athletic were two points behind them with a game to play and a superior goal average. In the event, Birmingham won 3–0 away at Luton Town to finish level on points with Aston Villa with a better goal average. Charlton were 1–0 ahead of Wolverhampton Wanderers when they heard that Birmingham had scored twice, so they needed another goal to overhaul them on goal average. They went on an all-out attack, but Wanderers' Dicky Dorsett broke away to score, thus confirming Charlton in third place. The Birmingham Evening Despatch said:

League table (part)

FA Cup

From the first round proper to the sixth round of the 1945–46 FA Cup, the first edition of the competition to be completed since war broke out, matches were played over two legs. Birmingham defeated Portsmouth, Watford, Sunderland and Bradford Park Avenue to reach the semi-final, in which they drew with Derby County at Hillsborough, Sheffield, in front of 65,000 spectators. In a match that "did not produce a great deal of high-class play [but] was very keenly contested", Raich Carter opened the scoring from Derby's first attack, Jock Mulraney "hit the angle of bar and post with a glorious shot from twenty yards", and the same player equalised early in the second half "after one of the best movements of the game".

The replay, at Maine Road, Manchester, attracted huge interest. The second half of the match was scheduled for live radio broadcast, and the gates were closed on safety grounds about an hour before kickoff, with thousands locked out. "Several thousands" of the official attendance of 80,407 "were allowed to sit on the ground almost up to the touch line". The match went goalless to the last half-minute of normal time, when Harold Bodle was unmarked  from goal. Derby goalkeeper Vic Woodley stayed on his line, and "Bodle took the ball to within eight yards of goal but hit the ball so near to Woodley that he was able to beat the ball away." Six minutes into extra time, defender Ted Duckhouse arrived just too late to stop Peter Doherty scoring Derby's first goal and sustained a broken leg in the collision with his opponent. No substitutes were allowed, and Birmingham went on to lose 4–0.

Appearances and goals

Players marked * were guests, not registered Birmingham City players.

See also
Birmingham City F.C. seasons

References
General
 
 
 
 Source for match dates, results, lineups, appearances, and goalscorers: Matthews (1995), Complete Record, p. 240.
 Source for attendances: Matthews (2010), Complete Record, pp. 482–83.
 Source for kit: "Birmingham City". Historical Football Kits. Retrieved 22 May 2018.

Specific

Birmingham City F.C. seasons
Birmingham City